Luka Grgić (born 7 June 1995) is a Serbian football striker.

Club career

Vojvodina
He made his Jelen SuperLiga debut for Vojvodina on 3 May 2014 in 1 : 0 away loss to Javor.

References

External links
 Luka Grgić Stats at utakmica.rs

1995 births
Living people
People from Kula, Serbia
Association football forwards
Serbian footballers
FK Vojvodina players
FK ČSK Čelarevo players
FK Proleter Novi Sad players
FK Hajduk Kula players
FK Zemun players
Serbian SuperLiga players
Serbian First League players